Total Bellas is an American reality television series that aired from October 5, 2016, to January 28, 2021 on E!. A spin-off of Total Divas, the series gave viewers a further look into the lives of twin sisters and professional wrestlers Brie and Nikki Bella, along with their immediate family and partners.

Production
On April 20, 2016, it was announced that former WWE wrestlers Brie and Nikki Bella—collectively known as the Bella Twins—would be getting a spin-off show entitled Total Bellas. The first season premiered on October 5, 2016. The show revolves around the lives of the twins and their family. Filming for the first season was set in Tampa, Florida as Brie Bella and Daniel Bryan moved in with Nikki Bella and John Cena to help Nikki after her neck surgery. Brie and Nikki's brother JJ and his wife Lauren had a recurring role along with their mother Kathy Colace and her now husband John Laurinaitis.

On November 16, 2016, it was announced that E! renewed the show for a second season. The second season premiered on September 6, 2017. The second season was filmed in Phoenix, Arizona as Nikki Bella and John Cena move in with Brie Bella and Daniel Bryan to help Brie through her first pregnancy. In addition to Brie's growing baby bump, the second season documented Daniel's travels under his new role as General Manager of WWE's SmackDown Live.

On January 30, 2018, it was announced that a third season would be premiering in spring of 2018. On April 5, 2018, the premiere date for the third season was announced, airing on May 20, 2018.

On August 7, 2018, E! and WWE announced that Total Bellas had been renewed for a fourth season. On November 28, 2018, it was announced that the fourth season would premiere on January 13, 2019.

On June 19, 2019, while appearing on The Tonight Show Starring Jimmy Fallon, Brie and Nikki announced that the series would return for a fifth season which premiered on April 2, 2020.

On June 11, 2020, the series was renewed for a sixth season which premiered on November 12, 2020.

In June 2021, Essentially Sports reported that E! had canceled Total Bellas and its sister show Total Divas, citing low ratings and a lack of interest from those involved.

Cast

Main

Recurring

Episodes

Series overview

Season 1 (2016)

Season 2 (2017)

Season 3 (2018)

Season 4 (2019)

Season 5 (2020)

Season 6 (2020–21)

Awards and nominations

Broadcast
The show is broadcast in The United Kingdom, Canada, New Zealand, France and South Africa on the local E! network. 

The series is also available on Hulu, WWE Network and Peacock.

References

External links

2010s American reality television series
2016 American television series debuts
American television spin-offs
E! original programming
English-language television shows
Reality television spin-offs
Television series by Bunim/Murray Productions
Total Divas